Jens Carsten Jantzen (born 18 October 1948, in Störtewerkerkoog, Nordfriesland) is a  mathematician working on representation theory and algebraic groups, who introduced the Jantzen filtration, the Jantzen sum formula, and translation functors.

In 2012 he became a fellow of the American Mathematical Society.

His doctoral students include Wolfgang Soergel.

Publications

with Joachim Schwermer: 
with Walter Borho:

References

External links
home page of Jens Carsten Jantzen

Pictures from Oberwolfach

1948 births
Living people
20th-century German mathematicians
21st-century German mathematicians
University of Bonn alumni
Academic staff of the University of Bonn
People from Nordfriesland
Fellows of the American Mathematical Society